Krass/Ram-Man is a fictional character from the popular Masters of the Universe toy line by Mattel.

He is a member of the Heroic Warriors, characterized by his bulky, spring-legged, stumpy appearance and flat-topped metal helmet. Originally tagged by Mattel as the "heroic human battering ram", his special ability is propel himself forwards with his spring-like legs, to knock opponents or obstacles down with his super-hard helmet.

Original line
The Ram Man (or Ram-Man) action figure was released as part of the line's second wave, and was one of the first figures of the line to break away from the construction design of the standard figures. Instead, the figure has a hollow body, allowing his legs to slide up inside his torso and clip in place. A latch on the back of his boot releases him, causing him to spring forward with a headbutting action.

The original prototype for the figure gave Ram Man an orange tunic and red legs. The final release had a red tunic and green legs, but his original prototype colour scheme was still used on back of box listings and in a number of appearances in the franchise's other media.

Ram Man's first appearance is in the early Mattel mini-comic "He-Man Meets Ram-Man". In this comic Ram Man is portrayed as a loner who lives on a stretch of barren land. He will attack anyone who crosses his land, believing their intention is to fight him, and although his past is not delved into it is implied he had retreated to this stretch of land after being continuously victimized by others. The story began with He-Man crossing his land, and despite stating his peace, Ram Man disbelieves him and attacks him. Left with no choice but to fight Ram Man, He-Man fights back and quickly beats him.

Humiliated by this defeat, Ram Man swears to get revenge on He-Man, and his confusion is taken advantage of by Skeletor, who was spying on the fight. Skeletor tricks Ram Man into believing He-Man is evil, and leads him to Castle Grayskull, where he forces Ram Man into ramming the jaw bridge repeatedly to gain entry to the castle, where Ram Man believes He-Man is. When The Sorceress witnesses Skeletor's attempt to break into Grayskull, she calls He-Man to her aid, who releases Ram Man from Skeletor's clutches and drives away the villain. Realizing he had been tricked and that He-Man means him no harm, Ram Man befriends He-Man and joins the Heroic Warriors.

As with several early characters, Ram Man's mini-comic appearances decreased as new characters were showcased.

1980s Filmation cartoon
Although large and aggressive in his mini-comic appearance, the 1980s cartoon He-Man and the Masters of the Universe by Filmation depicts him as a small, dwarfish figure, which is actually closer in appearance to his action figure.

In order to make the character more child-friendly for the sake of the show's intended audience, Ram Man's aggressiveness is toned down for the series. He is portrayed generally as a comical character, slow and dim-witted with an almost childlike mentality, but also strong-hearted and easily likeable. He often appears alongside Stratos in early episodes, and later episodes flesh out his character more, particularly the season 2 episode "Not So Blind", which shows a degree of humanity in his mostly slapstick personality. Another notable moment for Ram Man is the episode "House of Shokoti part 1", in which he gives a memorable moral at the end of the episode, telling kids not to hit things with their head like he does in case they hurt themselves. Also, in the second part of this story, Ram Man irritates Shokoti by constantly mispronouncing her name, calling her "Shipoopi" among other things. This version of Ram Man also often has other cartoonish features such as his legs actually uncoiling like springs on occasion and making "boing" sounds when he used his abilities.

Unlike other early characters, such as Stratos and Evil Warriors such as Tri-Klops, who faded into the background as newer characters were introduced in the cartoon, Ram Man continued to appear regularly in later episodes of the cartoon.

2002 series
Ram Man features in the modern revival of Masters of the Universe, and his portrayal in the contemporary series is something of a mixture between his Filmation portrayal and his original mini-comic portrayal. Here he is once again drawn as a large and bulky rather than a dwarfish character, and is actually larger than even He-Man in size. In episodes were he removes his helmet, he appears to have a metal plate on top of his head with a military flat-top hair cut. Although this series depicts him in a more macho fashion more in-keeping with the original concept of the character, his slow-wittedness and comic appeal is left intact. There is still a childlike dimension to his character, made most evident in the episode "Night of the Shadow Beasts", which reveals he is afraid of the dark. Perhaps his most significant episode of the modern-day series is "Siren's Song", in which he falls under a mesmerising spell by Evil-Lyn, which results in him coming under suspicion of being a traitor to the Masters. Unaware of the crime he has committed under a trance state, Ram Man is shown as excitable and overly-defensive as the Masters try to identify the traitor in their ranks.

One big difference from the Filmation series is that, in the 2002 series, Ram Man doesn't have springy legs that make him bounce, so he just walks and runs like a normal person.

Popular culture
In 2011, BBC Online reported that performer Jamie Moakes was trying to create "a new commodity, one to replace gold, silver and copper", by buying as many Ram Man figures as possible.

Reception
Ram Man was voted No.9 in The 10 Most Unfortunate Masters Of The Universe Toys by Io9. Ram Man was voted No.12 in The 12 Coolest Masters of the Universe Action Features by Topless Robot. Ram Man was voted by Mania.com as the fourth most Crazy Masters of the Universe Figures. CBR voted Ram Man 14th worst He-Man toy.

References

Fictional characters introduced in 1985
Masters of the Universe Heroic Warriors
Fictional soldiers
Male characters in animated series